Anabel Medina Ventura (born 15 December 1996) is a Dominican Republic athlete. She competed in the mixed 4 × 400 metres relay event at the 2020 Summer Olympics.

References

External links
 

1996 births
Living people
Dominican Republic female sprinters
Athletes (track and field) at the 2020 Summer Olympics
Olympic athletes of the Dominican Republic
Place of birth missing (living people)
Olympic silver medalists for the Dominican Republic
Olympic silver medalists in athletics (track and field)
Medalists at the 2020 Summer Olympics
Central American and Caribbean Games medalists in athletics
Central American and Caribbean Games bronze medalists for the Dominican Republic
Competitors at the 2018 Central American and Caribbean Games
20th-century Dominican Republic women
21st-century Dominican Republic women